Vreme zabave (trans. Time of Entertainment) was a Serbian popular culture magazine.

History
Vreme zabave was launched in 1993 by newspaper company Vreme. The magazine's editor-in-chief was journalist and music critic Petar Luković. The first issue was released in June 1993, with the price of 2,000,000 dinars. The last, 31st issue, was released in June 1996.

References

1993 establishments in Yugoslavia
1996 disestablishments in Serbia
Cultural magazines
Defunct magazines published in Serbia
Magazines established in 1993
Magazines disestablished in 1996
Serbian-language magazines
Serbian rock music